The men's +90 kg blind judo event at the 2015 European Games in Baku was held on 26 June at the Heydar Aliyev Arena.

Results

Repechage

References

External links

Men's blind +90 kg